Raduga is a Russian-language music radio station that is licensed to Klaipėda, Lithuania. The station began broadcasting on September 1, 2001.

Programs 
 Nauja Diena
 Non Stop
 Geriausias Laikas
 100 Ir 8 Malonumai
 Užvesk!
 Rožinė Spalva
 TOP-20

References

External links

Radio stations in Lithuania
2001 establishments in Lithuania
Russian-language radio stations
Mass media in Klaipėda
Russian diaspora in Europe